The Roman Catholic Diocese of Kiyinda–Mityana is a diocese located in the cities of Kiyinda and Mityana in the Ecclesiastical province of Kampala in Uganda.

History
 July 17, 1981: Established as Diocese of Kiyinda–Mityana from Metropolitan Archdiocese of Kampala

Construction of Cathedral

The cathedral of St. Noa Mawaggali was constructed between 1963–65 based on the design of the Swiss architect Justus Dahinden.

Bishops
 Bishops of Kiyinda–Mityana (Roman rite)
 Bishop Emmanuel Wamala (1981.07.17 – 1988.06.21), appointed Coadjutor Archbishop of Kampala; future Cardinal
 Bishop Joseph Mukwaya (1988.06.21 – 2004.10.23)
 Bishop Joseph Anthony Zziwa (since 2004.10.23)

Coadjutor Bishop
Joseph Anthony Zziwa (2001-2004)

See also
Roman Catholicism in Uganda
Mityana

References

External links
 GCatholic.org
 Catholic Hierarchy

Sources
 catholic-hierarchy

Roman Catholic dioceses in Uganda
Christian organizations established in 1981
Roman Catholic dioceses and prelatures established in the 20th century
Mityana District
1981 establishments in Uganda
Roman Catholic Ecclesiastical Province of Kampala